Dhanusha is an ancient unit of measuring height used in Jain literature.

Modern units
One Dhanusha equals 3 meters.

References

Units of measurement